Paul Salvator Goldengreen (bon 27 August 1960 in Warburg, Germany) is an artist whose work originates in Art Brut / Outsider Art.

Life
After fifteen months of basic military training with the German Army at Münster and Lüneburg in 1980/81, he got the Abitur after 6 semesters from 1982 to 1984 at Westfalenkolleg in Paderborn. 
Beginning in autumn 1985, he studied Biology in Münster and Bielefeld. In 1991 he left Bielefeld and returned home. After the death of his mother he suffered a mental illness.

Work

Since April 2007 he has been featured in the permanent Internet exhibition, Gallery Of Inspiration, organised by the International Society for the Study of Trauma and Dissociation (North America). In April 2007 he contributed 20 paintings to the first Outsider Art market at the Prinzhorn Collection, Heidelberg. His work Archaic Deity is part of the Prinzhorn Collection.
The painting was shown in the group exhibition "The Collection Grows".

External links
 Official Website of the artist
 profile at artecomunicarte (Spanish)
 Paul at isstd (English)

20th-century German painters
20th-century German male artists
German male painters
21st-century German painters
21st-century German male artists
Outsider artists
1960 births
Living people